Richard Wharton is an American actor.

Wharton began his career in 1986 in the film Running Scared. In 2012, he appeared as The Hippy in Seven Psychopaths. He has also had several guest roles on television shows like The Mentalist, CSI: Miami, Nip/Tuck, and others.

Wharton is also a stage actor. In 1988, he appeared in Sam Shepard's play Seduced, at the Immediate Theatre Company in Chicago, Illinois. He was nominated for a Joseph Jefferson Award for Actor in a Principal Role in a Play for his performance on that play.

Filmography

Film

Television

External links
 

American male film actors
Living people
American male television actors
American male stage actors
Year of birth missing (living people)